The Palm Beach Town Hall is a historic site in Palm Beach, Florida. It is located at 360 South County Road. On January 28, 2005, it was added to the U.S. National Register of Historic Places.

It was built in 1925 to designs by Harvey and Clarke with additions and renovations later made by several notable architects.

Gallery

References

External links

 Palm Beach County listings at National Register of Historic Places

National Register of Historic Places in Palm Beach County, Florida
Palm Beach, Florida